Parte is the Italian word for part. It can refer to:

 Part (music)
 Conjugation of French verb "partir"; see French conjugation

Surname
 Víctor de la Parte (b. 1986), Spanish cyclist

See also
 Ex parte, Latin legal term for "by the party"